Jason John Manford (born 26 May 1981) is an English comedian, presenter, actor and singer.

Manford was a team captain on the Channel 4 panel show 8 Out of 10 Cats from 2007 until 2010 and has presented numerous television shows for the BBC and ITV including Comedy Rocks (2010–2011), The One Show (2010), Show Me the Funny (2011), A Question of Sport: Super Saturday (2014), Bigheads (2017) and Children In Need (2022), and is one of four judges on ITV's Starstruck (2022).

Manford has starred in numerous stage musicals in the West End and across the UK such as Sweeney Todd, The Producers, Chitty Chitty Bang Bang, Guys and Dolls and Curtains.

Early life
Jason John Manford was born in Salford on 26 May 1981, the son of Sharon (née Ryan) and courtroom stenographer and trade union shop steward in the NHS Ian Manford. His maternal grandmother, Nora (née Peate), was an Irish Catholic from Dublin. Manford and his four siblings grew up in a terraced house in the Whalley Range area of Manchester. He attended St. Margaret's Primary School in Whalley Range, and later Chorlton High School (at the time known as Oakwood High School). He formed a band in school with two friends, Simon and Neil, with his mother later saying that this was what got him into singing.

During a Twitter exchange in which Manford defended strike action undertaken by British Railway workers in the ASLEF trade union, Manford recalled the various workplaces he had worked in before his current career including building sites, call centres, shops, bars, warehouses and offices, stating "I didn't just leave school and say 'right, I'm off to play the arena!. While working as a glass collector at a local pub, Manford became interested in comedy after watching the likes of Eddie Izzard, Peter Kay and Johnny Vegas perform at the local comedy club. Kay recommended him to undertake an HND in media and performance at the University of Salford, which Kay himself had done. Despite not having the required A-level grades, he was accepted into the programme and eventually upgraded to a full degree. His brother Colin, also a University of Salford graduate, followed him into performing and is also a stand-up comedian.

Career

Television
From June to November 2007, Manford was on Ideal, where he had a small part as Jack, who had been dumped and cheated on by his girlfriend with 'little Darren', 'big Darren' and 'flu-strength Darren'. He later made another appearance in episode five of that series. He hosted a breakfast show on Xfm Manchester until May 2008.

From June to November 2007, Manford was Paramount Comedy's continuity announcer and writer. In June 2007, he took over from Dave Spikey as a team captain on 8 Out of 10 Cats. He presented his own show, Tonightly, which aired every weekday from 1 to 22 August 2008 and appeared as a celebrity supporter for inventor Kin Kam in a special charity edition of BBC Two's Dragons' Den for Sport Relief.

In March 2010, Manford was announced as host of a new comedy show called Comedy Rocks, featuring stand-up comedians and musical performances. A pilot was shown on ITV on 26 March 2010 and a full series began on the channel on 14 January 2011. On 26 May 2010, Manford was announced as the new presenter of BBC One's The One Show from July 2010. He resigned from the programme in November 2010 following allegations surrounding his private life.

He also made up one half of the Home Team with Peter Andre on the ITV game show Odd One In. In July 2011, Manford presented Show Me The Funny, a reality show on ITV involving ten comedians in which one is voted off each week. In 2013, Manford hosted three pilots: Good News, Bad News and Oh! What a Week for ITV, and You and Whose Army? for Sky1. None of them have yet been commissioned for a full series. He wrote and presented A Funny Old Year which was broadcast on ITV on New Year's Eve in 2012, 2013 and 2014. The show saw Manford take a look back over the past year's humorous events.

Since 21 June 2014, Manford has hosted a BBC One show called A Question of Sport: Super Saturday, a spin-off from BBC panel show A Question of Sport. On 21 September 2014, Manford guest hosted an episode of Sunday Night at the Palladium. He returned to present another show on 24 May 2015.

Manford played the role of Marty in the 2015 BBC Drama Ordinary Lies. In 2015, he hosted The Money Pit for Dave and It's a Funny Old Week for ITV.

In 2016, Manford joined Absolute Radio as their new Sunday morning show presenter.

In April 2017, Manford guest presented five episodes of The Nightly Show. He also presented the 2017 Laurence Olivier Awards for ITV, before returning to present the ceremony in 2019 and 2020.

In 2017, he presented a new Sunday-night entertainment series for ITV called Bigheads.

Since 2017, he has been the voice of Daisy's dad in a CHF Entertainment cartoon called Daisy & Ollie. He also writes some of the episodes for it.

In 2018, he fronted What Would Your Kid Do?, a new series for ITV.

In 2020, Manford came in second place as the Hedgehog on The Masked Singer. Manford hosted The Royal Variety Performance 2020 from the Blackpool Opera House, with performances including Gary Barlow, Melanie C, Steps and Britain's Got Talent 2020 winner Jon Courtenay.

In May 2021, Manford became the presenter of BBC quiz show Unbeatable.

In February 2022, Manford appeared on the final of the Masked Singer third series masked as Hedgehog performing a duet with winner Natalie Imbruglia masked as Panda.

In November 2022, Manford presented Children In Need alongside  Mel Giedroyc, Ade Adepitan , Alex Scott and Chris Ramsey.

Stand–up
After a successful first UK tour and high sales of the following DVD, filmed live at the Manchester Apollo, he began his "Turning into My Dad" tour on 14 July 2010.

In March 2010, Manford took part in Channel 4's Comedy Gala, a benefit show held in aid of Great Ormond Street Children's Hospital, filmed live at the O2 Arena in London on 30 March. He toured the UK with "First World Problems", between June and December 2013 and produced a DVD of the same name. His show "Muddle Class" was toured across the UK until the end of 2018. His tour "Like me" began in early September 2020 and will finish in October 2021.

In 2011, Manford became one of the shareholders of the Chester-based comedy club The Laugh Inn. He frequented the club to see shows and support the circuit comedians, as well as performing impromptu shows. The club closed in 2013.

Singing
Manford comes from a family of singers and musicians and sang regularly with them. In the TV competition Born to Shine in 2011, he was taught daily to sing in an operatic style; he went on to win the show, and has released an album of show tunes, titled A Different Stage.

On 25 November 2022, Manford released the single "Assembly Bangers", a song he had been closing his standup show with. The track, a medley of songs nostalgically associated with school assemblies including "This Little Light of Mine", "He's Got the Whole World in His Hands" and "Lord of the Dance", will donate all profits to the Trussell Trust's Emergency Fund Appeal. The single charted at number two on the UK Official Singles Sales Chart on 2 December 2022.

On 16 December 2022, Manford released Assembly Bangers: The Album with Chris Sutherland, with the "Christmas Assembly Bangers" single being released on the same day. Again, all proceeds were donated to the Trussell Trust.

Acting
In late 2013, Manford was the voiceover artist for the Jet2.com and Churchill Insurance adverts and is one of the voices in the BBC comedy sketch show Walk on the Wild Side. He appeared in series four of Channel 4's Shameless as a security guard who is seduced by Karen Maguire. In July 2012, Manford took over the role of Pirelli for a month (followed by a few dates in August) in the London revival of musical Sweeney Todd at the Adelphi Theatre opposite Michael Ball and Imelda Staunton.

Manford has a minor voice role in the Xbox 360 video game Fable III, playing Jammy, who teaches the player how to use mortars. He had a role in the BBC Three series Ideal and starred in an episode of BBC One's Moving On. In 2015, Manford played the role of Marty in the BBC One drama series Ordinary Lies, starring alongside Michelle Keegan, Max Beesley and Sally Lindsay. He also played the medium Alexander Le Cheyne in Episode 3 of Series 3 of Ripper Street. In 2015, Manford starred in his second musical as Leo Bloom in the 2015 UK tour of Mel Brooks' The Producers opposite Louie Spence, Phill Jupitus and Ross Noble.

He played Caractacus Potts in the UK tour of Chitty Chitty Bang Bang alongside Phill Jupitus, Michelle Collins, Martin Kemp, Carrie Hope Fletcher and Claire Sweeney. He toured with the production from February to April 2016, before the role was played by Lee Mead. Manford returned to the role in October 2016 and continued until the end of the tour in February 2017.

In 2019, he starred in Curtains, a musical whodunnit by Fred Ebb and John Kander, which toured the UK. It moved to the Wyndham's Theatre in London's West End mid-December until mid January 2020, after which it began a further UK tour.

In December 2020 he was due to make his pantomime debut as Muddles in Sleeping Beauty at the Manchester Opera House alongside Billy Pearce, Jodie Prenger, Eric Potts and Louis Gaunt, however due to the ongoing COVID-19 pandemic and the government's guidelines the performances were cancelled. He eventually made his panto debut in December 2022 at the Opera House as Captain Hook in Peter Pan alongside Ben Nickless, where he closed each performance by singing "Assembly Bangers".

Manford is due to star as the Cowardly Lion in The Wizard of Oz from June to September 2023 at the London Palladium with Ashley Banjo as the Tin Man. He will also return to pantomime at the Manchester Opera House in December 2023 to star in the title role of Jack and the Beanstalk opposite Ben Nickless who also returns.

Influences
Manford cites Billy Connolly as his comedy hero, after seeing him when Manford was 11, and comics such as Tommy Cooper and Peter Kay heavily influenced his comic style. In 2009, in an interview on Friday Night With Jonathan Ross, Manford talked about his passion for musicals, expressing an interest in taking a singing and acting role on stage, and giving a short, impromptu performance of "Suddenly Seymour" from Little Shop of Horrors.

Charity
In November 2008, Manford became patron of Savebabies, a charity campaigning for newborn screening.

In April 2014, Manford became a supporter of the cancer charity Stephen's Story. It was set up by Stephen Sutton , a 19-year-old blogger with terminal colorectal cancer who set up the initiative to help others battling cancer. All profits made by Manford's comedy clubs during May 2014, the month of Sutton's death, were given to the charity.

Personal life
Manford married his first wife, Catherine, in October 2007. They had four children together before separating in 2013: twin daughters born on 20 August 2009, a third daughter born in December 2010, and a son born in 2012. The family lived in Bramhall. He married his second wife, Lucy Dyke, in 2017; they have two children together.

Manford is a supporter of Manchester City FC.

Awards

Won
 Winner of the 1999 North West City Life Comedian of the Year
 Winner of the 2000 Leicester Mercury Comedian of the Year
 Winner of the 2005 Writers Guild of Great Britain and The List's Best Comedy Newcomer for his debut Edinburgh show Urban Legend
 Winner of the 2006 Chortle Award for Best Breakthrough Act
 Winner of the 2006 North West Comedy Awards category for Best Stand up on the North West Circuit

Nominated
 Finalist in the 2000 Channel Four So You Think You're Funny competition at the Edinburgh Fringe Festival
 Nominated for the 2001 Manchester Evening News Theatre Award for Comedy
 Nominated for the 2005 Perrier Award at the Edinburgh Fringe Festival for his debut one-man show Urban Legend
 Runner-up as Hedgehog (contestant) in 2020 The Masked Singer UK.

Discography

Studio albums

Singles

As lead artist

As featured artist

Filmography

Television

Musical theatre

Stand-up DVDs
Live at the Manchester Apollo (16 November 2009)
Live 2011 (14 November 2011)
First World Problems (10 November 2014)

References

External links

 Jason Manford Official site
 Jason Manford Comedy CV
 Jason Manford Chortle
 Jason Manford's Urban Legend review Chortle, 2005
 Seven Sundays (Short film) YouTube
 Forum for fans of comedian Jason Manford
 Jason Manford Interview Spoonfed, 22 October 2008
 
 
 The Jason Manford Show on Absolute Radio

1981 births
Living people
21st-century English comedians
21st-century English male actors
Alumni of the University of Salford
Comedians from Manchester
English game show hosts
English male comedians
English male television actors
English people of Irish descent
English stand-up comedians
English television presenters
Male actors from Salford
Television personalities from Greater Manchester